Kalki Koechlin is a French actress and writer, who works primarily in Bollywood and theater productions in India. Her work has garnered her such accolades as a National Film Award, a Filmfare Award, The Hindu Metroplus Playwright Award, and two Screen Awards among others. She was conferred with the Knight of the Order of Arts and Letters by the French Minister of Culture for her contributions to the field of arts.

Awards and nominations

Other awards
Koechlin was conferred with the Knight of the Order of Arts and Letters by the French government in June, 2018.

References

External links
 

Koechlin, Kalki
Koechlin, Kalki